Demetrius II or Demetrios II may refer to:
 Demetrius II Aetolicus (died 229 BC), king of Macedon
 Demetrius II of India (died ca. 150 BC)
 Demetrius II Nicator (died 125 BC), ruler of the Seleucid Empire 
 Demetrius II of Abkhazia (ruled 837/38–872/73 AD)
 Demetrius II of Georgia (died 1289 AD)
 Demetrius I of Georgia (died 1156 AD)
 Pope Demetrius II of Alexandria, ruled in 1861–1870
 MV Demetrios II, a cargo ship wrecked in 1998